Tony Gravely (born September 28, 1991) is an American mixed martial artist who competes in the Bantamweight division of the Ultimate Fighting Championship.

Background
Gravely's father was a taekwondo instructor for over 25 years, so he started taking Tae Kwon Do when he was about three or four years old. He trained and competed in Tae Kwon Do until he started wrestling in sixth grade, continuing wrestling from sixth grade all the way through college.

A native of Martinsville, Virginia, Gravely attended Magna Vista High School, where he was a four-time all-state wrestler. He had two undefeated seasons and was a two-time Virginia state champion while wrestling in high school.

After high school, Gravely attended Appalachian State University in North Carolina on a wrestling scholarship. In three seasons wrestling for the Mountaineers, Gravely appeared in two NCAA Tournaments and won a Southern Conference Tournament Championship.  He left Appalachian State with a major in construction management.

According to the Martinsville Bulletin, Gravely quit his construction project manager day job in 2016 and decided to focus full-time on an MMA career.  He trained at Tech MMA Academy in Southwest Virginia for years as he pursued a professional fighting career.

Mixed martial arts career

Early career
Following a 6-1 amateur career, Gravely had his first professional fight in October 2015 against Chad Wiggington. He won the fight at the Elite 8 Warrior Challenge in a unanimous decision to claim his first victory. In his second bout, Gravely lost to Pat Sabatini by first-round rear-naked choke submission at CFFC 52.

After a  six fight winning streak, Gravely suffered dropped three of his next four fights, getting submitted by Ricky Bandejas in the second round, outpointed by Merab Dvalishili, and armbarred by Manny Bermudez. For his lone outing with Legacy Fighting Alliance at LFA 17, Gravely defeated Keith Richardson via unanimous decision. He also defeated Jerrell Hodge and Jordan Morales. On the strength of that run, Gravely challenged Patchy Mix (11-0) for the KOTC Bantamweight Championship at KOTC: No Retreat in May 2018. Gravely was submitted by the first round, falling to Mix’s dangerous guillotine. Gravely defeated his next three foes via TKO that saw wins over Drako Rodriguez, earning him the KOTC Bantamweight Championship and James Quigg. In the main event of CES MMA 53, he knocked out Kody Nordby in the first round for the CES MMA Bantamweight Championship. Gravely would defend his CES MMA title twice with back to back stoppages at CES MMA 54 where he knocked out Kris Moutinho in the fourth round and CES MMA 55 where Gravely submitted Darren Mima in round two via rear-naked choke.

Gravely got his break in UFC when he was selected to be a part of Dana White's Contender Series 24 in 2019. He earned the formal invite to join the UFC after recording a knockout of Ray Rodriguez in the third round of his Contender Series fight.

Ultimate Fighting Championship

Gravely made his UFC debut against Brett Johns on January 25, 2020 at UFC Fight Night: Blaydes vs. dos Santos. He lost the fight via a rear-naked choke in round three. This bout earned him the Fight of the Night award. Brett Johns in Raleigh, North Carolina. After his debut, Gravely announced he would be moving to Florida to train with American Top Team.

Gravely faced Geraldo de Freitas on November 14, 2020 at UFC Fight Night: Felder vs. dos Anjos. He won the fight via unanimous decision.

Gravely was scheduled to face Nate Maness at UFC on ESPN: Whittaker vs. Gastelum on April 17, 2021. However, Maness was removed from the bout for undisclosed reasons and he was replaced by Anthony Birchak. Gravely won the fight via technical knockout in round two. This fight earned him a Performance of the Night award.

The bout with Maness was rescheduled for September 18, 2021 at UFC Fight Night: Smith vs. Spann. Gravely lost the fight via technical knockout in round two.

Gravely faced promotional newcomer Saimon Oliveira on January 22, 2022 at UFC 270. He won the fight via unanimous decision.

Gravely faced Johnny Muñoz Jr. on June 4, 2022, at UFC Fight Night 207. He won the bout in the first round after knocking down Muñoz after the latter ran into an uppercut on a takedown attempt.

Gravely faced Javid Basharat on September 17, 2022 at UFC Fight Night 210. He lost the bout via unanimous decision.

Gravely faced Victor Henry on March 11, 2023 at UFC Fight Night 221. He lost the fight via split decision.

Championships and accomplishments
Ultimate Fighting Championship
 Fight of the Night (One time) 
 Performance of the Night (One time) 
CES MMA
CES MMA Bantamweight Championship (One time)
Two successful defenses
King of the Cage
King of the Cage Bantamweight Championship (One time)
Fight Lab
Fight Lab Bantamweight Championship (One time)
PA Cage Fight
PACF Bantamweight Championship (One time)

Mixed martial arts record

|-
|Loss
|align=center|23–9
|Victor Henry
|Decision (split)
|UFC Fight Night: Yan vs. Dvalishvili
|
|align=center|3
|align=center|5:00
|Las Vegas, Nevada, United States
|
|-
|Loss
|align=center|23–8
|Javid Basharat
|Decision (unanimous)
|UFC Fight Night: Sandhagen vs. Song 
|
|align=center|3
|align=center|5:00
|Las Vegas, Nevada, United States
|
|-
|Win
|align=center|23–7
|Johnny Muñoz Jr.
|KO (punches)
|UFC Fight Night: Volkov vs. Rozenstruik
|
|align=center|1
|align=center|1:08
|Las Vegas, Nevada, United States
|
|-
|Win
|align=center|22–7
|Saimon Oliveira
|Decision (unanimous)
|UFC 270
|
|align=center|3
|align=center|5:00
|Anaheim, California, United States
|
|-
|Loss
|align=center|21–7
|Nate Maness
|TKO (punches)
|UFC Fight Night: Smith vs. Spann 
|
|align=center|2
|align=center|2:10
|Las Vegas, Nevada, United States
|
|-
|Win
|align=center|21–6
|Anthony Birchak
|TKO (punches)
|UFC on ESPN: Whittaker vs. Gastelum
|
|align=center|2
|align=center|1:31
|Las Vegas, Nevada, United States
|
|-
| Win
| align=center|20–6
| Geraldo de Freitas
| Decision (split)
|UFC Fight Night: Felder vs. dos Anjos 
|
|align=center|3
|align=center|5:00
|Las Vegas, Nevada, United States
|
|-
| Loss
| align=center|19–6
| Brett Johns
|Submission (rear-naked choke)
|UFC Fight Night: Blaydes vs. dos Santos 
|
|align=center|3
|align=center|2:53
|Raleigh, North Carolina, United States
|
|-
| Win
| align=center|19–5
| Ray Rodriguez
|TKO (punches)
|Dana White's Contender Series 24
|
|align=center|3
|align=center|2:16
|Las Vegas, Nevada, United States
| 
|-
| Win
| align=center| 18–5
| Darren Mima
|Submission (rear-naked choke)
| CES 55: Wells vs. de Jesus
| 
| align=center| 2
| align=center| 4:54
| Hartford, Connecticut, United States
| 
|-
| Win
| align=center| 17–5
| Kris Moutinho
|KO (punches)
|CES 54: Andrews vs. Logan
|
|align=center| 4
|align=center| 4:02
|Lincoln, Rhode Island, United States
|
|-
| Win
| align=center|16–5
|Kody Nordby
|KO (slam)
|CES 53: Gravely vs. Nordby
|
|align=center|1
|align=center|0:36
|Lincoln, Rhode Island, United States
|
|-
| Win
| align=center|15–5
|Drako Rodriguez
|TKO (punches)
|KOTC: Territorial Conflict
|
|align=center|5
|align=center|3:49
|Niagara Falls, New York, United States
|
|-
| Win
| align=center| 14–5
| Bruno Ferreira
|TKO (punches)
|Road to M-1 USA
|
|align=center|1
|align=center|N/A
|Nashville, Tennessee, United States
|
|-
| Win
| align=center|13–5
| James Quigg
|TKO
| Fight Lab 59
|
| align=center|3
| align=center|1:08
|Charlotte, North Carolina, United States
|
|-
| Loss
| align=center| 12–5
| Patchy Mix
|Submission (guillotine choke)
|King of the Cage: No Retreat
|
|align=center|1
|align=center|1:44
|Salamanca, New York, United States
|
|-
| Win
| align=center|12–4
|Jerrell Hodge
| Decision (unanimous)
|CFFC 68
|
|align=center|3
|align=center|5:00
|Atlantic City, New Jersey, United States
|
|-
| Win
| align=center|11–4
|Jordan Morales
| Decision (unanimous)
|PA Cage Fight 29
|
|align=center|3
|align=center|5:00
|Wilkes Barre, Pennsylvania, United States
|
|-
| Win
| align=center|10–4
|Keith Richardson
|Decision (unanimous)
|LFA 17
|
|align=center|3
|align=center|5:00
|Charlotte, North Carolina, United States
|
|-
| Win
| align=center| 9–4
| Francis Healy
|Decision (unanimous)
|KOTC: Heavy Hands
|
|align=center|3
|align=center|5:00
|Washington, Pennsylvania, United States
|
|-
| Loss
| align=center|8–4
| Manny Bermudez
|Submission (armbar)
|Cage Titans 33
|
|align=center|1
|align=center|N/A
|Plymouth, Massachusetts, United States
|
|-
| Loss
| align=center|8–3
| Merab Dvalishvili
|Decision (unanimous)
|Ring of Combat 57
|
|align=center|3
|align=center|5:00
|Atlantic City, New Jersey, United States
|
|-
| Win
| align=center|8–2
| Tim Sosa
| Decision (unanimous)
|KOTC: Harm's Way
|
| align=center|3
| align=center|5:00
|Washington, Pennsylvania, United States
|
|-
| Loss
| align=center|7–2
| Ricky Bandejas
| Submission (rear-naked choke)
|CFFC 60
|
|align=center|2
|align=center|2:32
|Atlantic City, New Jersey, United States
| 
|-
| Win
| align=center| 7–1
| Dave Roberts
| TKO (punches)
| CFFC 58
| 
| align=center| 3
| align=center| 2:37
| Atlantic City, New Jersey, United States
| 
|-
| Win
| align=center| 6–1
| Dylan Cala
|Submission (rear-naked choke)
|Cage Rage 4
|
|align=center| 1
|align=center| 3:01
|Greensboro, North Carolina, United States
|
|-
| Win
| align=center|5–1
|Paul Grant
|TKO (punches)
|Ring of Combat 54
|
|align=center|3
|align=center|1:02
|Atlantic City, New Jersey, United States
|
|-
| Win
| align=center|4–1
|Reginald Barnett Jr.
|Decision (unanimous)
|Elite Warrior Challenge 9
|
|align=center|3
|align=center|5:00
|Salem, Virginia, United States
|
|-
| Win
| align=center| 3–1
| Dwayne Holman Jr.
|Decision (unanimous)
|CFFC 55: Chookagian vs. Varela
|
|align=center|3
|align=center|5:00
|Atlantic City, New Jersey, United States
|
|-
| Win
| align=center|2–1
| Vladimir Kazbekov
|Submission (rear-naked choke)
| Global Proving Ground 22
|
| align=center|2
| align=center|4:20
|Mt. Laurel, New Jersey, United States
|
|-
| Loss
| align=center| 1–1
| Pat Sabatini
| Submission (rear-naked choke)
|CFFC 52: Horcher vs. Regman
|
| align=center|1
| align=center|2:47
|Atlantic City, New Jersey, United States
|
|-
| Win
| align=center|1–0
| Chad Wiggington
| Decision (unanimous)
|Elite Warrior Challenge 8
|
|align=center|3
|align=center|5:00
|Salem, Virginia, United States
|

See also 
 List of current UFC fighters
 List of male mixed martial artists

References

External links 
  
 

Living people
Bantamweight mixed martial artists
1991 births
American male mixed martial artists
Mixed martial artists utilizing taekwondo
Mixed martial artists utilizing collegiate wrestling
Mixed martial artists utilizing Brazilian jiu-jitsu
American male taekwondo practitioners
American practitioners of Brazilian jiu-jitsu
Ultimate Fighting Championship male fighters
American male sport wrestlers
Amateur wrestlers